The Ambrosini SAI.403 Dardo ("Dart") was a light fighter aircraft built in Italy during World War II.

Design and development
SAI.403 Dardo was a considerably refined version of the SAI.207, designed during the delays in that type's development.  The improvements induced the Ministero dell' Aeronautica in 1943 to cancel its order for 2,000 of the SAI.207 so as to order 3,000 of the SAI.403 instead (800 from Ambrosini, 1,000 from Caproni, and 1,200 from Savoia-Marchetti).  Apart from the fighter's superlative performance, its all-wood construction was attractive at a time when Italy was facing a shortage of strategic materials.  However, by the time of the Armistice, the first of these was yet to leave the factory.

Operational history
The single prototype (MM.518) was seized by the Germans and evaluated by the Luftwaffe at Vergiate. Japanese pilots then stationed in Germany were also given a chance to fly the aircraft, with the result that it was ordered into production by both Heinkel and Mitsubishi. None of these flew before the end of the war.

Variants
SAI.403A
Point-defense fighter (gross weight 2,478 kg/5,460 lb) armed with 2 × 12.7 mm Breda-SAFAT machine guns.
SAI.403B
Standard fighter (gross weight 2,643 kg/5,830 lb) armed with 2 × 12.7 mm Breda-SAFAT machine guns and 2 × 15 mm MG 151/15 cannons or 2 × 20 mm MG 151/20 guns.
SAI.403C

Operators

Luftwaffe (captured)

Regia Aeronautica

Specifications (prototype)

See also

References

Notes

Bibliography

 Cattaneo, Gianni. SAI-Ambrosini 207 e derivati (bilingual Italian/English). Roma, Italy: La Bancarella Aeronautica, 2005.
 Taylor, Michael J. H. Jane's Encyclopedia of Aviation. London: Studio Editions, 1989.

SAI Ambrosini aircraft
Low-wing aircraft
1940s Italian fighter aircraft
Single-engined tractor aircraft
Aircraft first flown in 1943